Annenheim is a village in the municipality of Treffen in southern Austria.

Annenheim is a station of the S-Bahn Kärnten regional transport system.

Cities and towns in Villach-Land District